"Professor" Peter Schickele (born July 17, 1935) is an American composer, musical educator, and parodist, best known for comedy albums featuring his music, but which he presents as being composed by the fictional P. D. Q. Bach. He also hosted a long-running weekly radio program called Schickele Mix.

From 1990 to 1993, Schickele's P. D. Q. Bach recordings earned him four consecutive wins for the Grammy Award for Best Comedy Album.

Early life
Schickele was born in Ames, Iowa, United States, to Alsatian immigrant parents. His father, Rainer Schickele (1905, Berlin – 1989, Berkeley, California), son of the writer René Schickele, was an agricultural economist teaching at Iowa State University. In 1945, Schickele's father took a position at George Washington University in Washington, D.C.; then, in 1946, became chairman of the Agricultural Sciences Department at North Dakota Agricultural College (now North Dakota State University) in Fargo, North Dakota.

In Fargo, the younger Schickele studied composition with Sigvald Thompson. He attended Fargo Central High School, graduating in 1952. He then attended Swarthmore College, graduating in 1957 with a degree in music; he was the first student at Swarthmore, and the only student in his class, to earn a music degree. He was a contemporary of Ted Nelson at Swarthmore, and he scored Nelson's experimental film, The Epiphany of Slocum Furlow. It was his first film score. He graduated from the Juilliard School in 1960 with a master's degree in musical composition.

Early career

Schickele wrote music for a number of folk musicians, most notably Joan Baez, for whom he also orchestrated and arranged three albums during the mid-1960s, Noël (1966), Joan (1967), and Baptism (1968). He also composed the original score for the 1972 science fiction film Silent Running.

Schickele, an accomplished bassoonist, was also a member of the chamber rock trio The Open Window, which wrote and performed music for the 1969 revue, Oh! Calcutta! and released three albums.

The humorous aspect of Schickele's musical career came from his early interest in the music of Spike Jones, whose musical ensemble lampooned popular music in the 1940s and 1950s. While at Juilliard (1959), Schickele teamed with conductor Jorge Mester to present a humorous concert, which became an annual event at the college. In 1965, Schickele moved the concept to The Town Hall (New York City) and invited the public to attend; Vanguard Records released an album of that concert, and the character of "P. D. Q. Bach" was launched. By 1972, the concerts had become so popular that they were moved to Avery Fisher Hall at Lincoln Center.

P. D. Q. Bach

Besides composing music under his own name, Schickele has developed an elaborate parodic persona built around his studies of the fictional "youngest and the oddest of the twenty-odd children" of Johann Sebastian Bach, P. D. Q. Bach. Among the fictional composer's "forgotten" repertory supposedly "uncovered" by Schickele are such farcical works as The Abduction of Figaro, Canine Cantata: "Wachet Arf!" (S. K9), Good King Kong Looked Out, the Trite Quintet (S. 6 of 1), "O Little Town of Hackensack", A Little Nightmare Music, the cantata Iphigenia in Brooklyn, the Concerto for Horn and Hardart, The Art of The Ground Round (S. $1.19/lb.), Blaues Gras (The Bluegrass Cantata), and perhaps best known of all, the dramatic oratorio Oedipus Tex, featuring the "Okay Chorale". Though P. D. Q. Bach is ostensibly a Baroque composer, Schickele extends his repertoire to parody much more modern works, for example Einstein on the Fritz, a parody of his Juilliard classmate Philip Glass.

His fictitious "home establishment", where he reports having tenure as "Very Full Professor Peter Schickele" of "musicolology" and "musical pathology", is the "University of Southern North Dakota at Hoople", which is described as "a little-known institution which does not normally welcome out-of-state visitors". To illustrate the work of his uncovered composer, Schickele invented a range of rather unusual instruments. The most complicated of these is the Hardart, a variety of tone-generating devices mounted on the frame of an "automat", a coin-operated food dispenser. This modified automat is used in the Concerto for Horn and Hardart, a play on the name of proprietors Horn & Hardart, who pioneered the North American use of the automat in their restaurants.

He also invented the "dill piccolo" for playing sour notes; the "left-handed sewer flute"; the "tromboon" ("a cross between a trombone and a bassoon, having all the disadvantages of both"); the "lasso d'amore"; the double-reed slide music stand, which he described as having a "range of a major third and even less expressiveness"; the "tuba mirum", a flexible tube filled with wine; and the "pastaphone", an uncooked tube of manicotti pasta played as a horn. Other invented instruments of his include the "pumpflute" (an instrument that requires two people to play: one to pump, and one to flute) and the "proctophone" (a latex glove attached to a mouthpiece, and "the less said about it, the better"). The überklavier or super piano, with a 15-octave keyboard ranging from sounds which only dogs can hear down to sounds which only whales can make, was invented in 1797 by Klarck Känt (pronounced "Clark Kent"), a Munich piano-maker who demonstrated the instrument for P. D. Q. A sample of a piece written for the überklavier, The Trance and Dental Etudes, appeared in P. D. Q.'s unauthorized autobiography, published in 1976. P. D. Q.'s Pervertimento for Bagpipes, Bicycle and Balloons (1965) demonstrated the inherent musical qualities of everyday objects in ways not equally agreeable to all who listen to them.

To a large degree, Schickele's music as P. D. Q. Bach has overshadowed his work as a "serious" composer.

During the 1970s and early 1980s, performances by Schickele of the music of P. D. Q. Bach often featured guest appearances by the Swarthmore College Choir, usually advertised as "fresh from their recent tour of Swarthmore, Pennsylvania".

Schickele performed two concerts to commemorate the 50th anniversary of his first concert, at The Town Hall in New York on December 28 and 29, 2015. He has since reduced his concert appearances due to health issues, but continued to schedule live concert performances through 2018.

Other musical career
Schickele has composed more than 100 original works for symphony orchestra, choral groups, chamber ensemble, voice, television and an animated adaptation of Where the Wild Things Are (which he also narrated). He made a brief foray into cinema with the Bruce Dern film Silent Running (1972), for which he composed the musical score and co-wrote the original songs "Silent Running" and "Rejoice in the Sun" with Diane Lampert. He has also written music for school bands, as well as for a number of musicals, including Oh! Calcutta!, and has organized numerous concert performances as both musical director and performer. Schickele was active on the international and North American concert circuit.

Schickele's musical creations have won him multiple awards. His extensive body of work is marked by a distinctive style which integrates the European classical tradition with an unmistakable American idiom.

Schickele has also created such not-quite-P. D. Q. Bach albums as Hornsmoke, Sneaky Pete and the Wolf, and The Emperor's New Clothes.

Schickele's music is published by the Theodore Presser Company.

Radio
As a musical educator he also hosted the classical music educational radio program Schickele Mix, which aired on many public radio stations in the United States (and internationally on Public Radio International). The program began in 1992; lack of funding ended the production of new programs by 1999, and rebroadcasts of the existing programs finally ceased in June 2007. Only 119 of the 169 programs were in the rebroadcast rotation, because earlier shows contained American Public Radio production IDs rather than ones crediting Public Radio International. In March 2006, some of the other "lost episodes" were added back to the rotation, with one notable program remnant of the "Periodic Table of Musics", listing the names of musicians and composers as mythical element names in a format reminiscent of the periodic table.

Awards

Personal life and family
Schickele's two children, Matt and Karla, are both indie rock musicians. The two played together in the indie rock trio Beekeeper in the 1990s.

Karla Schickele then joined the band Ida, has recorded solo music under the name K. Matt Schickele, and is part of the M Shanghai String Band. She is also an orchestral music composer.

Schickele's brother, David Schickele (1937–1999), was a film director and musician.

References

External links
 
 
 
 Schickele's page at Theodore Presser Company
 The Peter Schickele Myspace (Maintained by a fan)
 Interview with Schickele, February 5, 1988
 Bach Project – Peter Schickele
 Peter Schickele interview
 "Composing Thoughts" radio interview
 Schickele's papers at the Rare Book and Manuscript Library, Columbia University, New York

1935 births
Classical music radio presenters
20th-century classical composers
21st-century classical composers
American classical bassoonists
American male classical composers
American classical composers
American opera composers
Male opera composers
American parodists
American satirists
American comedy musicians
Parody musicians
Aspen Music Festival and School alumni
Grammy Award winners
Juilliard School alumni
Living people
P. D. Q. Bach
Vanguard Records artists
Telarc Records artists
People from Ames, Iowa
People from Fargo, North Dakota
Swarthmore College alumni
American musicologists
Humor in classical music
Classical musicians from Iowa
Classical musicians from North Dakota
Pupils of Darius Milhaud
Pupils of Vincent Persichetti
Pupils of William Bergsma
21st-century American composers
20th-century American composers
20th-century American male musicians
21st-century American male musicians